Kerr McInroy (born 31 August 2000) is a Scottish footballer who plays as a midfielder for Scottish Premiership club Kilmarnock.

Early and personal life
Born in Glasgow, McInroy grew up in Dunfermline. His grandfather is a supporter of Dunfermline Athletic and he was once a season ticket holder at the club. He attended Woodmill High School before moving to St Ninian's High School as part of Celtic's school project.

Career

Celtic
McInroy played youth football with Cowdenbeath before joining Celtic's academy at the age of 12. He became the captain of the reserve team at Celtic but suffered a torn anterior crucial ligament in May 2019, meaning he was out injured until February 2020.

He joined Dunfermline Athletic on loan in September 2020. He made his debut for the club on 6 October 2020 in a 1–0 victory over Dumbarton in the Scottish League Cup, before making his league debut on 17 October 2020 in a 3–1 victory over Inverness Caledonian Thistle.

In September 2021, McInroy joined Airdrieonians of Scottish League One on loan until January 2022. He was then loaned to Championship club Ayr United in January 2022.

Kilmarnock
On 13 June 2022, McInroy left Celtic and joined newly-promoted Scottish Premiership side Kilmarnock on a two-year deal.

International career
He has represented Scotland at under-17, under-19 and under-21 levels.

References

External links
 

2000 births
Living people
Scottish footballers
Footballers from Glasgow
Association football midfielders
Celtic F.C. players
Dunfermline Athletic F.C. players
Airdrieonians F.C. players
Ayr United F.C. players
Scottish Professional Football League players
Scotland youth international footballers
Scotland under-21 international footballers
Kilmarnock F.C. players
Cowdenbeath F.C. players